Pierre-Luc Dubois (born June 24, 1998) is a Canadian professional ice hockey centre for the Winnipeg Jets of the National Hockey League (NHL). Dubois was born in Sainte-Agathe-des-Monts, Quebec, but grew up in Rimouski. He was drafted third overall in the 2016 NHL Entry Draft by the Columbus Blue Jackets, playing with them for three seasons before being traded to the Jets.

Playing career

Youth
Dubois played in the 2010 and 2011 Quebec International Pee-Wee Hockey Tournaments with the Rimouski Océanic minor ice hockey team.

Junior
Dubois was drafted by the Quebec Major Junior Hockey League (QMJHL)'s Cape Breton Screaming Eagles in the first round, fifth overall, of the 2014 QMJHL Entry Draft, and began with the Screaming Eagles in the 2014–15 season. In his rookie season, Dubois was the league's top-scoring 16-year-old.

Leading up to 2016 NHL Entry Draft, Dubois was the top-ranked North American skater. He was described as a multi-dimensional player possessing the ability to influence a game in a number of ways, and a bona fide future star for an NHL club.

On December 11, 2016, Dubois was traded to the Blainville-Boisbriand Armada.

Professional

Columbus Blue Jackets 
On June 24, 2016, his 18th birthday, Dubois was drafted by the Columbus Blue Jackets third overall at the 2016 NHL Entry Draft. On June 29, he signed a three-year, entry-level contract with Columbus. He was invited to the Blue Jackets' development camp but was sent back to the Eagles for the 2016–17 season, after which he was traded to the Blainville-Boisbriand Armada.

Dubois began the 2017–18 season in the NHL, playing centre to wingers Artemi Panarin and Josh Anderson. He scored his first career NHL goal on October 6, 2017, against the New York Islanders in a 5–0 win. He scored his first career NHL hat-trick on March 29, 2018, against the Calgary Flames. With his hat-trick, Dubois broke the Blue Jackets rookie scoring record that was previously held by Rick Nash.

On August 6, 2020, Dubois recorded the first playoff hat-trick in Blue Jackets franchise history in a 4–3 overtime victory against the Toronto Maple Leafs.

On December 31, 2020, Dubois signed a two-year, $10 million contract with the Blue Jackets. However, two weeks after signing the contract, he requested a trade from the team. While Blue Jackets' general manager Jarmo Kekäläinen initially stated he was in no rush to trade Dubois, the situation between Dubois and Columbus became increasingly untenable. This culminated in Dubois being benched after the first period during a 3–2 overtime loss to the Tampa Bay Lightning on January 21, 2021, following Dubois' lackadaisical play early in the game.

Winnipeg Jets 
On January 23, 2021, Dubois was traded with a 2022 third-round pick to the Winnipeg Jets in exchange for Patrik Laine and Jack Roslovic. The 2020–21 season was played in a specialized format due to the COVID-19 pandemic, with the Jets part of the all-Canadian North Division, and Dubois had to quarantine for two weeks upon arrival, limiting his training and preparation time. He sustained an injury in only his second game with the team, missing four games as a result. On February 21, in just his third game with the Jets, Dubois scored his first two goals as a Winnipeg Jet in a 4–3 overtime Jets win against the Vancouver Canucks. Dubois' second goal of the game was the overtime winner. Dubois also scored an assist in the same game, coincidentally doing the same thing that Laine did in his last game as a Winnipeg Jet (scoring 2 goals and 1 assist, with one of the two goals coming in overtime). The season ultimately proved disappointing for both Dubois and the Jets. The team qualified for the 2021 Stanley Cup playoffs, but after sweeping the Edmonton Oilers in the first round they were swept in turn by the Montreal Canadiens in the second. Another injury prematurely concluded Dubois' regular season, and delayed his playoff debut against the Oilers. He managed only eight goals and twelve assists in 41 games in the regular season, ending a 24-game goalless streak. He fared little better in the postseason, with only three assists in seven games Dubois said afterward "I know I can be a lot better. This year was my fourth year in the NHL. I'm really happy with my first three."

The 2021–22 season was a further disappointment for the Jets, ultimately missing the playoffs. Dubois, however, saw major improvement compared to his first season, scoring 28 goals and registering 32 assists, a new high in goals and nearly equaling his best seasonal points total. The Winnipeg Sun remarked that he "embodies everything the Jets want in their lineup and their leadership core," and looked like a possible successor to top centre Mark Scheifele, making the end of his current contract a major issue for the team. However, it was reported near the end of June that Dubois had informed the Jets that he did not intend to sign a new long-term deal, and would test free agency in 2024. Reports began to circulate that Dubois instead had an interest in playing for the Montreal Canadiens, the NHL's storied Quebec franchise, with his agent Pat Brisson confirming to TVA Sports that Montreal was "a place, a city he’d like to play in. That’s all I can say about that." On July 15, The Athletic reported that Dubois was attempting to force a trade to the Canadiens, and had attended the 2022 NHL Entry Draft in Montreal in person because he believed a trade would be consummated on the draft floor. However, it was said that Winnipeg general manager Kevin Cheveldayoff had demanded in exchange a player that Canadiens general manager Kent Hughes was unwilling to trade, and instead the Canadiens acquired Kirby Dach from the Chicago Blackhawks at the draft. This report encouraged further speculation as to Dubois' future with the team, amplified further by his decision on July 22 to accept a one-year, $6 million qualifying offer from the team.

International play

On December 1, 2015, Dubois was announced as 1 of 30 players invited to the Canadian selection camp for the 2016 World Junior Hockey Championships; he was one of only two 17-year-olds invited.

On April 27, 2018, Dubois was named to the senior Team Canada for the 2018 IIHF World Championship. He managed three goals and four assists in nine games, but Team Canada ultimately finished in fourth place, losing the bronze medal game to Team USA.

On May 10, 2019, Dubois was a late inclusion to Canada's roster at the 2019 IIHF World Championship, joining the squad following the Blue Jackets' second-round defeat in the 2019 Stanley Cup playoffs. Dubois helped Canada progress through to the playoff rounds before losing the final to Team Finland on May 26, earning the silver medal. He finished the tournament with three goals and seven points through eight games. Three years later, with the Jets failing to make the playoffs, Dubois joined Team Canada again for the 2022 IIHF World Championship, and immediately distinguished himself as one of the team's best players. Team Canada again reached the championship final, but ended with a 4–3 loss to Team Finland. Dubois earned his second World silver, and had seven goals and six assists in the tournament.

Personal life
Dubois is a dual citizen of Canada and the United States; his mother Jill is originally from Atlanta, Georgia. His father, Éric Dubois, is a former professional ice hockey player and is currently defensive coach of the Winnipeg Jets' American Hockey League (AHL) affiliate, the Manitoba Moose, which are also based in Winnipeg. Dubois began playing hockey when he was three years old in Germany, where his father played in the Deutsche Eishockey Liga (DEL). He also has a sister, Daphne, who is two years older; she is studying in Quebec.

Career statistics

Regular season and playoffs

International

Awards and honours

References

External links

1998 births
Living people
Blainville-Boisbriand Armada players
Canadian ice hockey centres
Canadian people of American descent
Cape Breton Screaming Eagles players
Columbus Blue Jackets draft picks
Columbus Blue Jackets players
French Quebecers
Ice hockey people from Quebec
National Hockey League first-round draft picks
People from Rimouski
People from Sainte-Agathe-des-Monts
Winnipeg Jets players